The Platte Valley Conference (PVC) was a northwest Missouri-based athletic conference that featured exclusively small, primarily rural schools that are member institutions of the Missouri State High School Activities Association (MSHSAA).  This conference was considered one of the stronger sports leagues in class 1 of Missouri sports. It disbanded in 2016 when it merged with the 275 Conference.

Sports
Member schools in the PVC fall football lineup included the Dekalb Tigers, North Andrew Cardinals, Southwest Livingston Wildcats, South Nodaway Longhorns, Stewartsville Cardinals, and Union Star Trojans. These teams competed in Missouri eight-man football.

For basketball, the conference kept most of its football competitors: the Dekalb Tigers, North Andrew Cardinals, South Nodaway Longhorns, Stewartsville Cardinals, and Union Star R-2 Trojans. Also in the PVC basketball group were the Jefferson Eagles, Northeast Nodaway Bluejays, and the Osborn Wildcats.
Starting in 2011-2012, the Platte Valley Conference has had a conference basketball tournament featuring the 8 basketball schools.

On February 6, 2015, the Grand River Conference accepted North Andrew and they moved to the GRC starting in the 2016-2017 school year.  The remainder of the PVC joined the 275 Conference starting in the 2016-2017 school year.

List of member schools

Former members
In years past, the Platte Valley Conference also included Fillmore, but the town's high school consolidated with the North Andrew School District in 1993.  The conference also included Elwood, KS through the 2010-2011 school year when they consolidated with Wathena, KS to form Riverside High School.

References

High school sports conferences and leagues in the United States
Missouri high school athletic conferences